Berg is a surname of North-European origin. In several Germanic languages (e.g. German, Dutch, Norwegian, and Swedish [Danish: Bjerg]), the word means "mount", "mountain", or "cliff".

Notable people sharing the surname "Berg"

In music

Alban Berg (1885–1935), Austrian composer
Andrea Berg, German singer
Bill Berg (musician), American drummer
Bob Berg (1951–2002), American jazz saxophonist
Cia Berg (born 1963), Swedish singer and television presenter
 Cy Berg, vaudeville performer and the "Berg" in the group Witt and Berg
Else Berg (1877–1942), Dutch painter
Emil Berg, Swedish singer
Espen Berg (born 1983), Norwegian jazz pianist and composer
Gunnar Berg (composer) (1909–1989), Swiss-born Danish composer
Joakim Berg (born 1970), lead singer of the Swedish band Kent
Lillie Berg (1845–1896), American musician, musical educator
Moe Berg (musician) (born 1959), Canadian singer-songwriter
Shelly Berg (born 1955), American jazz pianist and educator
Yung Berg (born 1985), American rapper

In media and the arts 

A. Scott Berg (born 1949), American biographer
Adam Berg (director) (born 1972), Swedish music video director, brother of Joakim Berg
Alan Berg (1934–1984), American talk radio host
Alec Berg, American television writer
Bengt Berg (born 1946), Swedish poet and politician
Bolette Berg (1872–1944), Norwegian photographer
Carol Berg (born 1948), American fantasy writer
Dave Berg (cartoonist) (1920–2002), American cartoonist for MAD
Dick Berg (1922–2009), American screenwriter and producer
Elizabeth Berg (author) (born 1948), American novelist
Gertrude Berg (1894–1966), American radio and television actress 
Gretchen J. Berg, American television producer
Gunnar Berg (painter) (1863–1893), Norwegian painter
Guri Berg (born 1963), Norwegian sculptor
John Berg (actor) (1949–2007), American actor
John Berg (art director), (1932–2015), American art director
Lene Berg, (born 1965), Norwegian film director
Mary Berg, Canadian chef and television personality
Nancy Berg (1931–2022), American model and actress
Peter Berg, American actor, film director, producer and writer

In politics and religion 

Axel Berg (born 1959), German politician
Bill Berg (politician) (1939-1967), Royal Canadian Mounted police man
Bruno II von Berg (c. 1100 – 1137), Archbishop of Cologne
Charles A. Berg (1927-2014), American farmer and politician
David Berg (1919–1994), founder of the religious movement Children of God
Delmer Berg (1915-2016), American member of the Abraham Lincoln Brigade during the Spanish Civil War; labor union activist
Eivinn Berg (1931–2013), Norwegian diplomat and politician
Friedrich Wilhelm Rembert von Berg (1793–1874), Russian statesman and military figure
Gordon Berg (1927–2013), American farmer and politician
Gunnar Berg (politician) (1923–2007), Liberal Party politician
Gunner Berg, Norwegian priest, writer and politician
Harry Berg (1943-2020), American politician and educator
Herbert Berg (religion), religious studies professor at the University of North Carolina
John Berg (priest) (born 1970), American Catholic cleric
Jónína Kristín Berg (born 1962), Icelandic neopagan leader, art teacher and aromatherapist
Julius S. Berg (1893–1938), New York politician
Kim Berg (born 1974), Finnish politician
Michael Berg (born 1945), politician and anti-war activist, father of Nick Berg
Philip Berg (1927–2013), founder of the Kabbalah Centre
Philip J. Berg (born 1944), activist and former deputy attorney general of Pennsylvania
Moe Berg (1902–1972), U.S. baseball player and spy
Nick Berg (1978–2004), American businessman beheaded in Iraq
Ove H. Berg (1840-1922), American politician
Stephen Jay Berg (born 1951), American Catholic bishop
Thomas K. Berg (born 1940), American lawyer and politician

In science, medicine and technology 

Carlos Berg (1843-1903), Latvian-born Argentine naturalist and entomologist
Christine Berg, American radiation oncologist and physician-scientist 
Gabriele Berg (born 1963), German biologist and ecologist
Jeremy M. Berg, the director of the National Institute of General Medical Sciences
Lev Berg (1876–1950), biologist and geographer
Max Berg (1870–1947), German architect and urban planner
Nathaniel Berg, president of the Guam medical society
Otto Berg (scientist) (1873–1939), German chemist, co-discoverer of the element rhenium
Otto Karl Berg (1815–1866), German botanist and pharmacist
Paul Berg (1926–2023), American biochemist
Raissa L. Berg (1913–2006), Russian geneticist and evolutionary biologist

In sport 

Aki-Petteri Berg (born 1977), Finnish ice hockey player
Allen Berg (born 1961), Canadian racing driver
Andrea Berg (volleyball) (born 1981), German volleyball player
Bill Berg (ice hockey) (born 1967), Canadian ice hockey player
Dave Berg (infielder) (born 1970), retired Major League Baseball player
Esmé Emmanuel Berg (born 1947), South African tennis player 
Grégoire Berg (1896–1944), French footballer
Henning Berg (born 1969), Norwegian football player
Herbert Berg (bobsleigh), German bobsledder
Jan Berg (footballer born 1943), Norwegian footballer
Jan Berg (footballer born 1965), Norwegian footballer
Jan Berg (Finnish footballer) (born 1985)
Justin Berg (born 1984), Major League Baseball player
Lindsey Berg (born 1980), American volleyball player
Marcus Berg (born 1986), Swedish football player
Moe Berg (1902–1972), American baseball player and spy
Odd Berg (footballer) (born 1952), Norwegian football player
Odd Berg (cyclist) (born 1923), Norwegian cyclist
Otto Berg (athlete) (1906–1991), Norwegian long jumper
Patty Berg (1918–2006), American golfer
Per Berg (born 1961), Danish curler
Rainer Berg (born 1965), French footballer
Viktor Berg (born 1977), Canadian squash player
Wilma van den Berg (born 1947), Dutch sprinter

In other fields 

Bryan Berg (born 1975) professional cardstacker
Gunnar Berg (Scouting) (1897–1987), Norwegian American director of the Boy Scouts of America
Odd Berg (ship-owner born 1894) (1894–1973), Norwegian ship-owner
Odd Berg (ship-owner born 1907) (1907–2005), Norwegian ship-owner
Paavo Berg (1911–1941), Finnish fighter ace
Richard Berg, wargame designer

See also
General Berg (disambiguation)
von Berg
Berg (disambiguation)

Russian Mennonite surnames